Feliciano López was the defending champion and successfully defended the title, defeating Richard Gasquet in the final, 6–3, 6–7(5–7), 7–5.

Seeds
The top four seeds receive a bye into the second round.

Draw

Finals

Top half

Bottom half

Qualifying

Seeds
The top four seeds receive a bye into the second round.

Qualifiers

Lucky losers
  Víctor Estrella Burgos

Qualifying draw

First qualifier

Second qualifier

Third qualifier

Fourth qualifier

References
 Main Draw
 Qualifying Draw

Aegon Internationalandnbsp;- Singles
2014 Men's Singles